Beverly's Full House is an American reality documentary television series that debuted March 31, 2012, on the Oprah Winfrey Network with 388,000 total viewers.

Overview
The series follows the family life of supermodel Beverly Johnson as she tries to bring three generations of her fragmented family together under one roof: her own home in the resort city of Palm Springs, California.

Cast

 Beverly Johnson
 Anansa Sims
 David Patterson
 Robert Dupont
 Nikki Haskell
 Brian Maillian

Episodes

References

2010s American reality television series
2012 American television series debuts
2012 American television series endings
Oprah Winfrey Network original programming
English-language television shows
Television shows set in Palm Springs, California
Television series by Good Clean Fun (production company)